Du Fu River Pavilion is a Chinese pavilion located on the bank of Xiang River, in Tianxin District of Changsha, Hunan, China, built in memory of the Tang (618–907) poet Du Fu (712–770). It is a part of Xiang River Scenery Belt. It is adjacent to Orange Isle and Yuelu Mountain.

History 
In the autumn of 768, Du Fu came to Tanzhou (now Changsha) from Chengdu Prefecture, crossed over to his friend Wei Zhijin, prefectural governor of Tanzhou. When he arrived, his friend had died. At first he lived on a boat. Later, he rented a house by the Xiang River and named it "River Pavilion". Two years later, he died of illness in a boat on the Xiang River.

During the Kangxi period (1662–1722) of the Qing dynasty (1644–1911), it was proposed to build a pavilion in memory of Du Fu, and then it was proposed one after another. In 2002, Changsha government decided to officially build it. Construction commenced in 2004 and was completed the following year. It was officially reopened to the public on 19 May 2005.

Architecture 
Du Fu River Pavilion is a typical Tang-style stories building with a high base.

The first floor is a souvenir shop for poetry, calligraphy and painting. The second floor is Du Fu Memorial Hall. Inside the second floor, a statue of Du Fu stands in the middle of the hall. Paintings are used on the wall to introduce the Du Fu's life. On both sides of the hall are the works of Zhang Daqian,  and other calligraphers. The third floor is the exhibition hall of Changsha historical celebrities. The fourth floor is the reception hall and antique exhibition hall.

References 

Towers in China
Buildings and structures in Changsha
Tourist attractions in Changsha
Tianxin District
2005 establishments in China